Andre Savelio (born ) is a professional rugby league footballer who plays as a  forward for Hull F.C. in the Betfred Super League.

He previously played for St Helens, on loan from the Saints  at the Castleford Tigers  in the Super League. He played for the Warrington Wolves, and on loan from the Super League side at the Rochdale Hornets in the Betfred Championship. He spent the 2018 and part of 2019 NRL season at the Brisbane Broncos, but did not feature in the National Rugby League (NRL) due to serious injury.

Early life
Savelio was born in Lower Hutt, New Zealand and raised in Warrington, England, having moved there as a one-year-old when his father, Samoa international Lokeni Savelio, started playing in the Super League.

Savelio attended Cardinal Newman Catholic High School, and played his amateur rugby league for Latchford Albion before being signed by St. Helens at the age of 14. He represented England at an under-16 and under-18 level.

Playing career
Savelio made his first team début for St Helens in March 2014 against Leeds. After the conclusion of the 2016 season, Savelio joined Warrington on a one-year deal.

In July 2017, he signed a two-year deal to play for the Brisbane Broncos. During a pre-season trial, Savelio suffered a season-ending injury.

He later joined Super League side Hull F.C. in 2019.  He played 12 games for Hull F.C. in the 2020 Super League season including the club's semi-final defeat against Wigan.

In April 2021, Savelio accused Wigan forward Tony Clubb of racial abuse during a match between the two sides. An investigation found Clubb guilty of a Grade F offence for using 'unacceptable language based on national or ethnic origin'. As a result, Clubb was suspended for eight matches and fined £500.

In round 10 of the 2021 Super League season, he scored a hat-trick in Hull FC's 64–22 victory over Leigh.

In round 15 of the 2021 Super League season, he was sent off after the full-time siren in Hull FC's 40–26 loss against Huddersfield.

Representative
On 25 June 2021 he played for the Combined Nations All Stars in their 26–24 victory over England, staged at the Halliwell Jones Stadium, Warrington, as part of England's 2021 Rugby League World Cup preparation.

References

External links
Hull FC profile
Brisbane Broncos profile
Saints profile
Profile at saints.org.uk
SL profile

1995 births
Living people
Castleford Tigers players
Combined Nationalities rugby league team players
English rugby league players
Hull F.C. players
New Zealand emigrants to England
New Zealand expatriate sportspeople in England
New Zealand sportspeople of Samoan descent
New Zealand rugby league players
People from Warrington
Rochdale Hornets players
Rugby league locks
Rugby league players from Lower Hutt
Rugby league second-rows
St Helens R.F.C. players
Warrington Wolves players